Khulsanurus (meaning "tail from Khulsan") is an extinct genus of alvarezsaurid theropod dinosaur from the Late Cretaceous Barungoyot Formation of the Khulsan Locality in the Gobi Desert region of Mongolia. The type and only species is Khulsanurus magnificus.

Description 
Khulsanurus is known from a holotype containing partial vertebral series of the neck and tail, scapulocoracoids, a right humerus, a possible left humerus, and a left pubis. Distinguishing autapomorphies of this specimen include pleurocoel-, carotid process-, and epipophysis-less cervical vertebrae, prominent infrapostzygapophyseal fossa of the caudal vertebrae which also bear anteriorly pointing prezygapophyses.

Classification 
Averianov & Lopatin (2021) placed Khulsanurus in a polytomy with Albinykus, Ceratonykus, Linhenykus, Parvicursor, Xixianykus, Qiupanykus, Nemegtonykus, PIN 5838/1 (=Ondogurvel) and a clade containing Shuvuuia and Mononykus in a strict consensus tree using unweighted characters. However, Averianov & Lopatin (2021) also recovered it in a polytomy with only Albinykus, Xixianykus, PIN 5838/1 (=Ondogurvel), Mononykus and Shuvuuia in a consensus tree using implied weighting. Averianov & Sues (2022) conducted a phylogenetic analysis using implied weighting which recovered it in a similar position but with inclusion of a clade containing Linhenykus, Ceratonykus and Parvicuror and the exclusion of Qiupanykus and Nemegtonykus, while a 50% majority rule tree from the same analysis placed it within a polytomy with two clades.

A phylogenetic analysis conducted by Averianov & Sues (2022) is reproduced below.

Paleoenvironment

Khulsanurus was found in the Campanian Barun Goyot Formation, which was also home to many other animals, including mammals such as Catopsbaatar and Nemegtbaatar, squamates such as Estesia, Gobiderma, and Proplatynotia, and numerous dinosaurs, including ornithischians such as Saichania, Tarchia, Zaraapelta, Tylocephale, Bagaceratops, Breviceratops, and Udanoceratops; sauropods such as Quaesitosaurus; and theropods, including Conchoraptor, Heyuannia, Nemegtomaia, Hulsanpes, Kuru, Shri, Ceratonykus, Ondogurvel, Parvicursor, Gobipteryx, and Hollanda.

References

Alvarezsaurids
Campanian genera
Late Cretaceous dinosaurs of Asia
Cretaceous Mongolia
Fossils of Mongolia
Barun Goyot Formation
Fossil taxa described in 2021
Taxa named by Alexander O. Averianov